Cyclodorippidae is a family of crustaceans belonging to the order Decapoda.

Genera:
 Clythrocerus Milne-Edwards & Bouvier, 1899
 Corycodus Milne-Edwards, 1880
 Cyclodorippe Milne-Edwards, 1880
 Deilocerus Tavares, 1993
 Ketamia Tavares, 1992
 Krangalangia Tavares, 1992
 Miotymolus Feldmann, Schweitzer, Casadio & Griffin, 2011
 Neocorycodus Tavares, 1993
 Simodorippe Chace, 1940
 Tymolus Stimpson, 1858
 Xeinostoma Stebbing, 1920

References

Decapods